The VLM (Veículo Lançador de Microssatélites) is a proposed three-stage satellite launcher being developed by the Brazilian General Command for Aerospace Technology in collaboration with Germany. The project originated in 2008 as a simplified version of the VLS-1 rocket, using only the core stages. The first launch is currently planned for no earlier than 2023.

A version based on the S-50 rocket engine is being developed, with the objective of launching satellites of up to 150 kg into equatorial circular orbits at 300 km altitude.

VLM-1 description

The VLM-1 vehicle is designed to deliver up to  payloads to a 300 km equatorial circular orbit. The first two stages will use the S-50 solid fuel engine, with the third using the same S-44 engine as in the VS-40 sounding rocket.
 Stage 1: S-50 rocket engine
 Stage 2: S-50 rocket engine
 Stage 3: S-44 rocket engine

Launches will be from the Alcântara Launch Center, located at the equator. There are plans to expand this design into the VLX launcher family, by adding liquid fuel upper stages or strap-on boosters.

Development history
Development on VLM started in 2008 for the purpose of low-cost and reliable launch of microsatellites, based on existing Brazilian sounding rockets like the VS-40 and technology developed for the VLS-1 project.

Initially, a four-stage rocket using solid fuel was proposed, arranged in the following order:
 Stage 1: S-43 rocket engine
 Stage 2: S-40TM rocket engine
 Stage 3: S-44 rocket engine
 Stage 4: S-33 rocket engine

VS-50

It was later decided in 2011 to build a precursor single-stage rocket bearing a new engine called S-50. The vehicle is being developed and its engine tested in collaboration with the German Space Agency (DLR). This precursor test is called VS-50 and is planned for launch in August 2023. All launches are planned to take place from the Alcântara Launch Center, located on Brazil's northern Atlantic coast.

On 1 October 2021, the Brazilian Space Agency conducted a first successful full burn test on land for 84 seconds of the S-50 engine as part of the final test campaign aiming to a complete operational VLM orbital launcher in 2025.

VLX family
When the VLM design and tests are completed to satisfaction, it is planned to develop a larger rocket family called VLX, targeting the delivery of payloads of between 300 and 500 kg to low Earth orbit. The VLX family will include two launchers named Aquila 1 (for delivery of 300 kg to 500 km) and Aquila 2 (for delivery of 500 kg to 700 km into a polar orbit). An early concept calls for two lateral S-50 engines configured as strap-on boosters. A new liquid fuel engine, called L-75, is being designed for this launcher family. As of 2018, it was hoped that the maiden flight of Aquila 1 would take place in 2023, and that of Aquila 2 in 2026.

Planned versions
In the future, the L5 liquid fuel rocket engine will replace the solid 3rd stage engine. The configuration will be:
 Stage 1: S-50 rocket engine
 Stage 2: S-50 rocket engine
 Stage 3: L5 rocket engine (to be developed)

Other possibilities
Brazilian researchers have studied the possibility of a cost-competitive launch system using S-50 engines in the first two stages and a set of liquid engines in the third stage. This system operating from the Alcântara Launch Center could insert satellites weighing up to 500 kg into polar orbits with a transport cost of approximately US$39,000 per kilogram of payload.

Proposed flights

The qualification flight is VLM-1 (or XVT-00).

See also
Alcântara Space Center

References

External links
Home website of VLM-1 at the Brazilian Space Agency

Rockets and missiles
Space launch vehicles of Brazil
Expendable space launch systems
Proposed space launch vehicles